Metal Galaxy is the third studio album by Japanese heavy metal band Babymetal. It was first released in Japan on October 8, 2019, with an international release following on October 11, 2019. The album was released through BMD Fox Records in Japan, in Europe under earMusic, and elsewhere under Babymetal Records. Produced by the band's manager Kobametal, the record is a concept album of an "odyssey to the Metal Galaxy" and contains elements of music from various parts of the world. It is also the first to contain guest performances from other artists, as well as their first release to not feature founding member Yuimetal. Due to the poor health, the band performed with one backup dancer to form a trio alongside Su-metal and Moametal. The band began a world tour in support of the album in September 2019, with support from Avatar and The Hu in the United States and Bring Me the Horizon in Japan.

Metal Galaxy received generally positive reviews from music critics, and managed to peak at number three on the Oricon Weekly Chart with first-week sales of 73,096 units. In the United States, the album debuted at number thirteen on the Billboard 200, becoming the highest-charting Japanese-language album in the chart's history. Four songs from the album were released as digital singles, with "Distortion", "Starlight", and "Elevator Girl" charting within the top four on the Billboard World Digital Songs chart. The album has sold 96,735 copies in Japan as of December 2019.

Background and release
On April 1, 2019, three years after the worldwide release of the band's second album Metal Resistance, Babymetal announced a third album with a release set for 2019, as well as a series of headlining shows in Japan, Babymetal Awakens: The Sun Also Rises and Babymetal Arises: Beyond the Moon – Legend "M" in the summer. With its title later revealed to be Metal Galaxy, it is the band's first album not to feature original member Yuimetal, who left the band in October 19, 2018 due to a medical issue.

Metal Galaxy was released in several editions varying by region. In Japan, the album was released in 16-track 2-disc editions via a standard edition in compact disc and LP formats, a CD limited edition with a DVD of music videos, "Sun" and "Moon" limited editions enclosed in LP-size jackets, and "The One" limited edition with a DVD, exclusively available to members of "The One" official fanclub. The album was also made available earlier in the region, on October 8, 2019. Internationally, the album was released in a standard 14-track single-disc edition, a 2-LP edition in black or transparent vinyl, and a download card, in various combinations.

On August 9, 2019, the band released the artwork for the Japanese "Sun" and "Moon" editions, along with the track listings for all editions of Metal Galaxy. The same day, pre-orders for the album were made available in physical and digital editions.

Composition
The band described the theme of the album as going "on an odyssey to the Metal Galaxy". Su-metal stated that the album is "like a toybox, with a different mixture of songs in there". The vocalist explained that, while Babymetal and Metal Resistance "had cool sounds to the songs", Metal Galaxy has a "new type of kawaii metal", and incorporates the sound of different countries in which the band has toured since the release of Metal Resistance, reflecting the "journey" made in the previous years. Kobametal stated that he wanted to create Babymetal in the image of the cultural diversity found around the world in music, with Metal Galaxy being a "conceit to explore this idea". The opening track "Future Metal" includes robotic narration stating: "This ain't heavy metal, welcome to the world of Babymetal" with a following "electronic flurry", "Elevator Girl" has elements of "languid jazz", "Shanti Shanti Shanti" is composed of Indian instrumentation, and "Night Night Burn!" contains elements of Latin music. Additionally, the songs "Starlight", "Shine", and "Arkadia" were called "a trilogy of lights". The album also features guest musicians, including gruff growls by Sabaton frontman Joakim Brodén on the track "Oh! Majinai", Arch Enemy member Alissa White-Gluz, and Thai rapper F. Hero on "Pa Pa Ya!!", continuing the band's trend of creating unconventional music. Additionally, "Da Da Dance" features B'z guitarist Tak Matsumoto, and "Brand New Day" features Polyphia guitarists Tim Henson and Scott LePage.

According to Kobametal, songwriting for Metal Galaxy began when he gathered songwriters together to discuss the kind of music in desire of exploration. Musical styles included Cuban rhythms, South American tribal music, and Scandinavian metal. "Night Night Burn!" is said to have started six years prior, at the same time as the production for the song "Megitsune".

Promotion

On April 1, 2019, Babymetal announced a series of headlining shows, Babymetal Awakens: The Sun Also Rises and Babymetal Arises: Beyond the Moon – Legend "M", with the latter shows taking place around Moametal's twentieth birthday, as a counterpart to Su-metal's Legend S: Baptism XX. The first set of shows, Babymetal Awakens, was performed at Yokohama Arena and with a dancer taking Yuimetal's place. Immediately after the second show, the band travelled to the United Kingdom to perform at Glastonbury Festival 2019 on June 30, 2019. A series of dancers, officially termed the Avengers, currently fill Yuimetal's role in the original trio formation. Titled as Metal Resistance Episode VIII, the era of Babymetal features a theme that the Avengers are said to be summoned by the Fox God.

Tour dates for the yet unnamed Metal Galaxy World Tour were first announced on May 10, 2019, with dates ranging from September 4, 2019 to March 1, 2020. A headlining show at The Forum in Los Angeles set to coincide with the release of Metal Galaxy.

On June 28, 2019, following the release of the single "Pa Pa Ya!!" and the band's subsequent performances at Yokohama Arena on June 28 and 29, Babymetal revealed the title of the record to be Metal Galaxy. The Metal Galaxy World Tour began in the United States on September 4, 2019, and was scheduled to conclude in Taiwan on April 3, 2020. The band's performance at The Forum near Los Angeles on October 11, 2019, coincided with the worldwide release date of Metal Galaxy. On October 13, 2019, Babymetal announced another leg of the tour to take place in Asia. On December 4, 2019, Babymetal announced another European leg of the tour, including an appearance at Download Festival in the United Kingdom.

Metal Galaxy World Tour

Cancelled/postponed shows

Singles
The first single released from the album, "Distortion" was released as a digital single on May 8, 2018, just short of the band's fourth world tour, the Babymetal World Tour 2018. A music video released the same day did not feature any of the band members of Babymetal, but rather the Chosen Seven of the era. The song charted at number two on the Billboard World Digital Singles chart. The song later had a limited-edition LP release on November 23, 2018. The album version features Alissa White-Gluz of the band Arch Enemy.

"Starlight" was released digitally as the second single from the album on October 19, 2018, prior to the Japanese leg of the Babymetal World Tour 2018, and coinciding with Yuimetal's official departure from the band. A music video was released on the same day. The song managed to peak at number two on the Billboard World Digital Singles chart.

The third single, "Elevator Girl", was released digitally on May 10, 2019, along with the band's announcement of the Metal Galaxy World Tour. The song reached number four on the Billboard World Digital Singles chart. A music video for an English-language version of the song was released on August 16, 2019.

"Pa Pa Ya!!" was released as the fourth single from the album on June 28, 2019, just before the first show Babymetal Awakens: The Sun Also Rises. A live performance of the song was released as a music video on July 1, 2019.

On September 27, 2019, Babymetal released a music video for the song "Shanti Shanti Shanti" on YouTube, having been released digitally as a promotional single for the album the same day (based on time zone).

On October 9, 2020, Babymetal uploaded a music video for "BxMxC" to YouTube, released the song worldwide as a digital single, and announced a December 9, 2020 release for Japanese limited-edition vinyl coupled with a live performance of the track at the show "Legend – Metal Galaxy".

Critical reception

Metal Galaxy received generally positive reviews from music critics, with most praising the instrumentation and diversity of the music. At Metacritic, which assigns a normalized rating out of 100 to reviews from mainstream publications, the album received an average score of 69, which indicates "generally favorable reviews", based on ten reviews.

Andrew Trendell of NME called the album a "wild ride that, through its sheer energy, is somehow infectiously accessible", while Classic Rock called the album "Wonderfully schizophrenic and shamelessly populist". A review by Kerrang! noted that "everything fizzes and bursts and explodes with neon delight" with a sound that's unique, yet familiar. Dean Van Nguyen of The Guardian considered the record "the kawaii metal My Beautiful Dark Twisted Fantasy" and an opus of the genre, and commented that the "pop vocals and traditional metal yelps creates a good-versus-evil battle that resembles dueling kaiju". Jason Pettigrew of Alternative Press called Metal Galaxy "striking in its abject weirdness", highlighting "In The Name Of" as "the best metallae-ton jam you've ever heard ". AllMusic writer James Christopher Monger made note how the album "tweaks the recipe just enough to feel fresh while maintaining the meticulous attention to detail and decibels", and that the opening track "Future Metal" presents the "idea of globe-trotting" throughout the album.

Sam Walker-Smart of Clash Music noted that while the album won't likely draw in listeners who don't look past the band's gimmick, "it's ridiculously fun in places, and it's clear that the musicians have a real love and understanding of the genre." Michael Pementel from Consequence of Sound called the record the band's "heaviest and most exhilarating work to date", despite some songs not being super "metal", and stated that the "hyper instrumentation that explores various musical styles throughout the world" expands the band's catchiness. Sarah Shodipe of The Line of Best Fit praised the opening track "Future Metal" for bringing "grandiose, soaring moments", but criticized "Oh! Majinai" for being "not as organic as it could". Grayson Haver Currin of Pitchfork called the record "an exultant, near-absolute mess", and, aside from the highlights of "Kagerou" and "Shine", an "embarrassing gimmickry".

Accolades

Commercial performance
Metal Galaxy debuted at number three on the Oricon Weekly Chart for the week of October 21, 2019, with 73,096 physical copies, as well as 5,700 digital copies. In the United Kingdom, the album debuted at number nineteen on the UK Albums Chart, becoming Babymetal's second top-twenty album on the chart. In the United States, Metal Galaxy debuted at number thirteen on the Billboard 200, becoming the highest-charting Japanese-language album in the chart's history. In October 2019, the band became the first Asian act to reach the peak of Billboard Top Rock Albums Chart. The album has sold 96,735 copies in Japan as of December 2019.

Track listing

Notes
 "Future Metal", "Da Da Dance", "In the Name Of", and "Pa Pa Ya!!" are stylized in all caps.
 "Oh! Majinai" is stylized as "Oh! MAJINAI".

Personnel
Credits adapted from Metal Galaxy liner notes.

 Suzuka Nakamoto – Lead vocals 
 Moa Kikuchi – Background vocals

Additional musicians
 Tak Matsumoto – guitar on "Da Da Dance"
 Joakim Brodén – vocals on "Oh! Majinai"
 Tim Henson, Scott LePage – guitar on "Brand New Day"
 Alissa White-Gluz – vocals on "Distortion"
 F. Hero – vocals on "Pa Pa Ya!!"

Production
Kobametal – production
Watametal – recording
Tue Madsen – mixing
Nick Sampson – mixing
Yuppemetal – mixing
Jens Bogren – mixing
Tucky-metal (Tucky's Mastering) – mastering

Charts

Weekly charts

Monthly charts

Year-end charts

Certifications

Release history

Notes

References

External links
 

2019 albums
Babymetal albums